is a railway station in the town of Kawanishi, Yamagata Prefecture, Japan, operated by East Japan Railway Company (JR East).

Lines
Inukawa Station is served by the Yonesaka Line, and is located 19.4 rail kilometers from the terminus of the line at Yonezawa Station.

Station layout
The station has one side platform serving a single bi-directional track. The station is unattended.

History
Inukawa Station opened on September 28, 1926. The station was absorbed into the JR East network upon the privatization of JNR on April 1, 1987. A new station building was completed in February 2002.

Surrounding area

See also
List of Railway Stations in Japan

External links

 JR East Station information 

Railway stations in Yamagata Prefecture
Yonesaka Line
Railway stations in Japan opened in 1926
Stations of East Japan Railway Company
Kawanishi, Yamagata